Sainte-Geneviève-de-Batiscan is a parish municipality in the Mauricie region of the province of Quebec in Canada. This municipality is part of the Les Chenaux Regional County Municipality in Batiscanie and in the administrative region of Mauricie. It is located along the Batiscan River.

The town of Sainte-Geneviève-de-Batiscan was the seat of the Lordship of Batiscan from 1665 and Champlain County from 1855 to 1981. During the first centuries of its history, the economy of the area has been focused on forestry, agriculture, fishing and river transport. Sainte-Geneviève was also a prominent center of trade for the Batiscanie.

Geography

The main village is situated on the northeast shore of the Batiscan River at the confluence of the Veillet River, while a small village is located just opposite, on the south-west. The Batiscan River through the village and splits into two parts.

The agricultural area of Sainte-Geneviève-de-Batiscan stops at the foot of the Saint-Narcisse moraine. It is a mountainous line in the east-west direction, between Sainte-Geneviève-de-Batiscan with Saint-Stanislas and Saint-Narcisse. Most of Sainte-Geneviève-de-Batiscan is included in the Batiscanie, except for two areas: one in the east, at the limit of Sainte-Anne-de-la-Pérade, and the other to the southwest, near the limit of Saint-Luc-de-Vincennes.

Toponymy

Initially, the Catholic parish was named in honour of Saint Genevieve, patron saint of France and the city of Paris, the largest French-speaking city in the world. In France, the French patron saint is also the Diocese of Nanterre and gendarmes.

The name "Batiscan" was derived from the chief of the Algonquin people from around 1610 to 1629, for whom the river was named after.

Demographics 

Catholic Parish
The civil records of Sainte-Genevieve de Batiscan start in July 1727 and are administered by the neighboring parish of Saint-François-Xavier-de-Batiscan up to the canonical erection of the Catholic parish of Sainte-Genevieve de Batiscan, which occurred on August 16, 1833. This Catholic parish falls within the Diocese of Trois-Rivières. A priest or a pastor serving resides since 1728.

Municipality

The municipality of Sainte-Genevieve de Batiscan was erected May 11, 1841 in the southeastern part of the Lordship of Batiscan under the Act 8 Vict. chap. 40, in July 1845. The territory of municipality of Sainte-Geneviève was detached from the parishes of Saint-François-Xavier-de-Batiscan and La Visitation de Champlain.

Regional Administration

From 1855 to 1982, the city was the seat of Champlain County. In 1982, the old county system was reformulated into the new regional county municipality (RCM) system, with Sainte-Geneviève-de-Batiscan becoming part of the Francheville RCM. On December 31, 2001, it was transferred from the Francheville RCM to the new Les Chenaux RCM, following the creation of the new City of Trois-Rivières and the dissolution of the Francheville RCM.

Notable people
Jacques J. Bouchard

See also 
 Batiscan River
 Batiscanie
 Lordship of Batiscan
 Batiscan, Quebec
 Champlain, Quebec
 Les Chenaux Regional County Municipality

References

Mediagraphy 
. 
Municipalité de Sainte-Geneviève-de-Batiscan: . 
Municipalité régionale de comté (MRC) des Chenaux: . 
Massicotte, Édouard-Zotique. Sainte-Geneviève-de-Batiscan, Trois-Rivières, Éditions du Bien public, 1936, 131 pages (Collection «Pages trifluviennes», série A, no 18). 
Rivard, Raymond, Sainte-Geneviève-de-Batiscan, 1833-1983, Sherbrooke, Albums souvenirs québécois, 1983. 160 pages. 
Répertoire des mariages de Sainte Geneviève de Batiscan 1727 à 1900, written by Dominique Campagna, 128 pages. 
Répertoire des sépultures de Sainte Geneviève de Batiscan 1727 à 1984, 1985, published by "La Société historique de Sainte Geneviève de Batiscan inc". 

Parish municipalities in Quebec
Incorporated places in Mauricie
Les Chenaux Regional County Municipality